The Grauspitz (Vorder Grauspitze or Vorder Grauspitz on some maps) is a mountain in the Rätikon range of the Alps, located on the border between Liechtenstein and Switzerland. It is also the highest summit of the Rätikon range west of the Schesaplana massif.

The mountain lies between the valleys of Lawenatal (municipality of Triesen) on the north and the Fläscher Tal (canton of Graubünden,  municipality of Fläsch) on the south.

The easiest route to the summit ascends over the peak Hinter Grauspitz, and along a class 3–4 razor ridge.

References

External links

Grauspitz on Summitpost
Grauspitz on Hikr

Mountains of Liechtenstein
Mountains of Switzerland
Mountains of the Alps
Liechtenstein–Switzerland border
International mountains of Europe
Mountains of Graubünden
Two-thousanders of Switzerland
Highest points of countries
Fläsch
Triesen